Bradina admixtalis is a species of moth of the family Crambidae described by Francis Walker in 1859. It is found in Australia (Victoria, New South Wales and Queensland), New Guinea, New Zealand, south-east Asia and the Comoros, Réunion, South Africa as well as India.

The wingspan is about 20 mm. The wings are pale brown. The forewings have a dark costa with two dark marks.

The larvae feed on grasses.

References

Moths described in 1859
Bradina
Moths of Africa
Moths of Asia
Moths of Oceania